The 1990 Australian Grand Prix was a Formula One motor race held at Adelaide on 4 November 1990. The race was the 55th Australian Grand Prix, and the sixth to be part of the Formula One World Championship.

The race was won by Brazilian driver Nelson Piquet, driving a Benetton-Ford. Englishman Nigel Mansell finished second in a Ferrari, with French teammate Alain Prost third. The win, Piquet's second in succession, secured third place for himself in the Drivers' Championship and the same position for Benetton in the Constructors' Championship. Compatriot Ayrton Senna took pole position in his McLaren-Honda and led until he suffered a gearbox failure on lap 62.

Qualifying

Qualifying report
Ayrton Senna took his tenth pole position of the season, and 52nd overall, in his McLaren-Honda with a time of 1:15.671, the fastest time recorded on the Adelaide street circuit to date. Alongside him on the front row, but over half a second slower, was his teammate Gerhard Berger. In his final race for Ferrari, Nigel Mansell took third, only 0.013 seconds ahead of teammate Alain Prost, followed by Jean Alesi in the Tyrrell and Riccardo Patrese in the Williams. The Benettons of Nelson Piquet and Roberto Moreno were seventh and eighth respectively, with Thierry Boutsen in the second Williams and Pierluigi Martini in the Minardi completing the top ten.

The four drivers failing to qualify were Michele Alboreto and Alex Caffi in the two Arrows, Yannick Dalmas in the AGS and Bertrand Gachot in the Coloni, the latter completing a clean sweep of non-qualifications for the season.

Qualifying classification

Race

Pre-race
As part of a television interview with Ayrton Senna after qualifying, former triple World Champion Jackie Stewart caused a stir when he claimed that Senna was part of too many race accidents for a driver of his ability compared to all the World Champions of the past. A visibly annoyed Senna stated he could not believe that someone of Stewart's racing experience, someone who knew first hand that accidents are a part of motor racing, would say that he was a dangerous driver, and challenged the Scotsman to go back and check his facts.

On race morning during the drivers briefing, McLaren boss Ron Dennis asked the officials for a ruling on what would happen if anyone decided to effectively straight-line the chicane after the start, asking if it was legal. FISA officials replied that any driver who did that would most likely damage their car so it was not advisable. At that point Alain Prost got up and walked out of the meeting, an action that earned him a 'yellow card' from FISA, but no fine. This puzzled many as walking out of the drivers briefing without good reason usually saw a driver fined.

Then, as per normal practice, the annual end-of-season drivers photo shoot took place prior to the race. As the race was the 500th World Championship Grand Prix there was also a photo shoot taken with several World Champions who were in attendance, including legendary five time Champion Juan Manuel Fangio. Alain Prost, still angry over the events at Suzuka, did not appear in either photo by his own choice as he did not want to appear with Ayrton Senna. This, and his public statements about his former McLaren teammate following the Japanese Grand Prix where he claimed Senna deliberately took him out at the first corner in the race to win the World Championship, lead to criticism of his mental state of mind by some including former World Champion turned BBC commentator James Hunt, who at the time believed the crash at Suzuka was just an accident and that Senna had not taken Prost out on purpose. Senna himself later said in 1991 that he was going to go for it in the first corner no matter the result. In a famous quote he said “If you no longer go for a gap that exists, you are no longer a racing driver”.

Hunt, who as the  Champion was in the photo shoot along with Fangio, Sir Jack Brabham, Denny Hulme, Stewart, and current drivers Senna and Nelson Piquet, claimed during the race commentary that Prost had been mentally beaten down by Senna after losing the championship to him in controversial circumstances and seemed to be "a driver who was under a form of mental collapse".

Other than Prost who chose not to take part, World Championship winning drivers who were still alive but not in the photo shoot due to not being in attendance in Adelaide were Phil Hill, John Surtees, Emerson Fittipaldi ( & ), Niki Lauda (& ), Mario Andretti, Jody Scheckter, and the winner of the inaugural race in Adelaide Keke Rosberg. The most surprising absentee was Australia's 1980 World Champion Alan Jones who was actually at the circuit that weekend racing a Ford Sierra RS500 in the Group A touring car support races as well as performing duties as a pit reporter for Australian host television broadcaster Channel 9.

Race report
The winner for the second race in a row was Brazilian veteran Nelson Piquet in his Benetton, giving the triple World Champion back to back wins for the first time since he won the  German and Hungarian Grands Prix while driving for Williams-Honda. He took a 3.129 second victory over Nigel Mansell after the Englishman had tried a passing move under braking for the hairpin at the end of the Brabham Straight which almost took out both cars, Mansell somehow managed to pull his Ferrari up in time to just miss Piquet and the lapped Brabham-Judd of Stefano Modena as they turned into the right hand hairpin. Piquet overtook Patrese at the start and Alesi a few corners later. He then took Prost on lap 3 at the end of the long straight and then outbraked Berger for third place at the same place on lap 9. He later overtook Mansell on the pit straight when Mansell's first set of tyres went off.

After making the best start, but being blocked in by the slow starting Berger, Alain Prost drove a steady, but for him unremarkable race other than a rare mistake when he ran wide at Brewery Bend late in the race while trying to stay ahead of the charging Mansell. Prost ran in 5th for most of the race, but eventually finished 3rd after Senna crashed out of the lead on lap 61 with gearbox trouble, and after Berger had also run wide at Brewery Bend and had to back off to conserve his tyres. Berger finished 4th, 9.6 seconds behind Prost. Rounding out the top six were the Williamses of 1989 Australian Grand Prix winner Thierry Boutsen, the last driver on the lead lap and in his last race for Williams, and Riccardo Patrese.

On lap 50, Senna broke Gerhard Berger's 1987 lap record of 1:20.416 (set in the turbocharged Ferrari F1/87) with a time of 1:19.302. In his late race pursuit of Piquet, Mansell continued to lower the lap record and eventually lowered it to 1:18.203 on lap 75. In his efforts to stay ahead of Mansell, Piquet set his fastest race lap on lap 79 with a time of 1:18.527, and then emulated Prost and Berger's earlier feats by running wide at Brewery Bend on lap 80 which allowed Mansell to close within two seconds. Piquet's fastest lap, set on the tyres which he had started the race on, was also the second fastest lap of the race. In the post race interview with the top three finishers, Piquet said with a smile that after his lap 80 off which allowed Mansell to close up to him that he had to "drive like hell" over the last lap and a half, and that the "shit almost hit the fan", referring to Mansell's last-ditch overtaking move which almost took both cars out. After slower times in the 1988 race, and no chance to beat it in the wet in 1989, some 9 drivers (Mansell, Piquet, Prost, Senna, Moreno, Boutsen, Alesi, Patrese and Berger himself) would go faster than Berger's 1987 record with only Berger of that group failing to go under 1:20.000.

The victory gave Piquet third place in the Drivers' Championship on countback, with the same number of points as Berger but two wins to the Austrian's none.

Race classification

Championship standings after the race
 Bold text indicates the World Champions.

Drivers' Championship standings

Constructors' Championship standings

References

Grand Prix
Australian Grand Prix
Australian Grand Prix
Motorsport in Adelaide
Australian Grand Prix